Milorad Mitrović (12 April 1908 – 9 August 1993) was a Serbian football defender who played for Yugoslavia at the 1928 Summer Olympics. For family reasons he moved to Split where he lived until his death.

References

External links
 
 
 Profile at Serbian federation official site

1908 births
1993 deaths
People from Veliko Gradište
Association football defenders
Yugoslav footballers
Serbian footballers
Yugoslavia international footballers
Montpellier HSC players
FC Sète 34 players
FK BASK players
Yugoslav First League players
Ligue 1 players
Yugoslav expatriate footballers
Yugoslav expatriate sportspeople in France
Expatriate footballers in France
Olympic footballers of Yugoslavia
Footballers at the 1928 Summer Olympics
Serbian football managers
Myanmar national football team managers